Avid Media Composer is a film and video editing software application or non-linear editing system (NLE) developed by Avid Technology.  Initially released in 1989 on Macintosh II as an offline editing system, the application has since evolved to allow for both offline and online editing, including uncompressed standard definition (SD), high definition (HD), 2K and 4K editing and finishing. Since the 1990s, Media Composer has been the dominant non-linear editing system in the film and television industry, first on Macintosh and later on Windows. Avid NewsCutter, aimed at newsrooms, Avid Symphony, aimed at finishing, were all Avid products that were derived from Media Composer and share similar interfacing, as were Avid Xpress Pro (discontinued in 2008) and its predecessor Avid Xpress DV, which were aimed at the lower end of the market.

There are 4 versions of Avid Media Composer; Media Composer | First (a freeware version), Media Composer, Media Composer | Ultimate, and Media Composer | Enterprise. Media Composer can be used as standalone software, or to which the user can add specific external I/O devices, either from Avid or from specific third parties.

History
According to Eric Peters, one of the company's founders, most prototypes of "the Avid" were built on Apollo workstations. At some point, Avid demoed one of their products at SIGGRAPH. Says Peters: "Some Apple people saw that demo at the show and said, 'Nice demo. Wrong platform!' It turned out they were evangelists for the then new Mac II (with *six* slots!). When we got back to our office (actually a converted machine shop) after the show, there was a pile of FedEx packages on our doorstep. They were from Apple, and they contained two of their prototype Mac II machines (so early they didn't even have cases, just open chassis). Also there were four large multisync monitors. Each computer was loaded with full memory (probably 4 megs at the time), and a full complement of Apple software (pre-Claris). That afternoon, a consultant knocked on our door saying, 'Hi. I'm being paid by Apple to come here and port your applications from Apollo to Macintosh.' He worked for us for several weeks, and actually taught us how to program the Macs." At the time, Macs were not considered to be fast enough for video purposes. The Avid engineering team, however, managed to get 1,200 kBytes per second, which allowed them to do offline video on the Macs.

The Avid Film Composer was introduced in August 1992. Film Composer was the first non-linear digital editing system to capture and edit natively at 24fps. Steven Cohen was the first editor to use Film Composer for a major motion picture, on Lost in Yonkers (1993).

The system has been used by other top editors such as Walter Murch on The English Patient, the first digitally edited film to receive a Best Editing Oscar.

In 1994, the Academy of Motion Picture Arts and Sciences awarded the Avid Film Composer with a plaque for Science & Technical Achievement. Six persons were recognized in that effort: Bill Warner, Eric Peters, Joe Rice, Patrick O'Connor, Tom Ohanian, and Michael Phillips. For continued development, Avid received an Oscar representing the 1998 Scientific and Technical Award for the concept, design, and engineering of the Avid Film Composer system for motion picture editing.

Film Composer is no longer available, since all of its specific film editing features were implemented into the "regular" Media Composer.

In July 2009, American Cinema Editors (ACE) announced that the ACE Board of Directors had recognized Avid Media Composer software with the Board's first ACE Technical Excellence Award.

In December 2022, as part of a long-awaited request for better interoperability between Avid's own apps, Media Composer 2022.12 was released as the first version to be able to export Pro Tools Sessions. This is not a replacement for AAF export, but an additional export function, allowing for a more seamless export process from Media Composer to Pro Tools.

User Interface (UI)
The Avid Media Composer user interface has seen many changes and upgrades over the years. Early versions focused on creating somewhat of a digital representation of the film editing process. The idea of organizing clips using bins was a familiar concept, so it was easy for editors to migrate from the flatbed editing world into Avid's digital interface. Also familiar was the Source/Record window which was seen in KEM and Steenbeck systems.

Through the 1990's the interface saw practical upgrades which were made in collaboration between its designers who were also working editors, and professional editors working in Hollywood and at network television studios. The interface design remained decidedly plain and two-dimensional. Interface design was focused more on clip management in the Timeline Window than on UI colors and buttons. 

Crossing Y2K and into the early 2000's with Media Composer 10, 11, and 12, the user interface saw significant advancements in not only project organization but also skeuomorphic design (making buttons and tools look like real-world items with lighting, shading, and sometimes textures). It gave users incredible power in defining their own preferences in button shapes and shading, color coding, workspace architecture, and other intricate customizations. In May 2003 when Avid Adrenaline introduced HD editing and a resetting of the version numbering back to 1.0, work on improving the user interface continued. 

With the release of Media Composer 5, the user interface saw a visual change. After extensive testing, the entire industry began discovering that skeuomorphic designs and other visual elements were causing drains on performance. For Media Composer, it was decided to scale-back the design and chase a "flatter" approach. Users who upgraded to this version were initially upset at the loss of customizability but were indeed satisfied with the noticeable reduction in interface lag. This design lasted through Media Composer and Symphony versions 5.0 through 2018.12.15.

By Media Composer 7, 8, and 2018, there was a consistent outcry from customers asking Avid to upgrade the overall interface. The consistent complaint was that it felt "old".

During 2018, Avid conducted extensive interviews, listening sessions, and ACA meetings with hundreds of users to absorb as much of their opinions as possible. Key outcomes from those sessions included needs for stronger organization abilities for bins (bin containers), tools and other interface elements that could snap-to each other, a "paneled" interface that could mold itself to any screen size or configuration, and a means of toggling between the classic concept of Avid Workspaces in a newer, more accessible way (Workspace Toolbar). Another common complaint of the classic interface was its overall performance, which had laggy timeline behavior in comparison to other nonlinear edit systems (NLEs). While the Media Composer team worked on the new user interface, the engineers and architecture team retooled the underlying code and video engine. In June of 2019, Avid released Media Composer 2019.6. 

Users saw consistent upgrades to the user interface throughout 2019, 2020, and 2021. As of late 2021, the majority of Media Composer users were subscription-based, and using the modern user interface.

Hardware 
Avid Mojo DX: a newer version of the Mojo with architecture offering faster processing and full 1920x1080 HD resolution in addition to standard definition video.  This interface has SDI/HD-SDI inputs and outputs, HDMI outputs and stereo 1/4" TRS audio inputs and outputs.

Avid Nitris DX: a replacement of the Adrenaline hardware, a successor to the original Avid Nitris (used with Avid DS and Avid Symphony), with architecture offering faster processing and full 1920x1080 HD resolution (without extra cards) in addition to standard definition video.  This interface also has a hardware DNxHD codec.  Video connections include SDI, HD-SDI, Composite, S-Video and Component (SD or HD) inputs and outputs, it also has a HDMI output.  Audio connections include XLR, AES, optical S/PDIF and ADAT inputs and outputs.  It also has RCA inputs and 1/4" TRS outputs, plus LTC timecode I/O.  Starting with Media Composer v5.5 an optional AVC-Intra codec module can be installed in the Nitris DX for native playback of this format.  With Media Composer v6.0 is it now possible to have two DNxHD or AVC-Intra modules installed for dual stream stereoscopic capture and full resolution stereoscopic playback.

Hardware history 
Media Composer as standalone software (with optional hardware) has only been available since June 2006 (version 2.5). Before that, Media Composer was only available as a turnkey system.

The 1990s 
From 1991 until 1998, Media Composer 1000, 4000 and 8000 systems were Macintosh-only, and based on the NuVista videoboard by Truevision. The first-release Avids (US) supported 640x480 30i video, at resolutions and compression identified by the prefix "AVR". Single-field resolutions were AVR 1 through 9s; interlaced (finishing) resolutions were initially AVR 21–23, with the later improvements of AVR 24 through 27, and the later AVR 70 through 77. AVR12 was a two-field interlaced offline resolution.  Additionally, Avid marketed the Media Composer 400 and 800 as offline-only editors. These systems exclusively used external fast SCSI drives (interfaced through a SCSI accelerator board) for media storage. Avid media was digitised as OMFI (Open Media Framework Interchange) format.

In the mid-nineties, versions 6 and 7 of Media Composer 1000, 8000 and 9000 were based on the Avid Broadcast Video Board (ABVB), supporting video resolutions up to AVR77. The video image was also improved to 720x480. 3D add-on boards (most notably the Pinnacle Alladin, externally, and the pinnacle genie pro board, internally, through special 100 pin bypass cable ) and 16bit 48K 4-channel and 8-channel audio I/O (Avid/Digidesign 442 and Avid/Digidesign 888) were optional.

The 1998 introduction of the Avid Symphony marked the transition from ABVB to the Meridien hardware, allowing for uncompressed SD editing. This introduction was also the first version of Media Composer XL available for the Windows operating system. Many users were concerned that Avid would abandon the Mac platform, which they eventually did not do. Media Composer XL versions 8 through 12.0.5 (models MC Offline XL, MC 1000 XL, MC 9000XL) were built around Meridien hardware. Compression options were expressed in ratios for the first time in the evolution of the product. Even though the video board had changed, the audio I/O was still handled by the Avid/Digidesign 888 (16bit 48K) hardware. At this time, 16x9 aspect ratios began to be supported.

The 2000s 
Avid Media Composer Meridien was released through November, 2003.

In 2003, Avid Mojo and Avid Adrenaline formed the new DNA (Digital Non-linear Accelerator) hardware line. The launch of Avid Media Composer Adrenaline brought along a software version renumbering, as it was labeled Avid Media Composer Adrenaline 1.0. At this time, Avid began using MXF (Material Exchange Format) formatting for media files. Avid products maintain compatibility with OMFI files.

Adrenaline was the first Media Composer system to support 24bit audio. It also meant the end of Film Composer and Media Composer Offline, since the Avid Media Composer Adrenaline featured most of the film options and online resolutions and features. From this point onward, Avid systems have supported media storage using SCSI, PCI-e, SATA, IEEE 1394a & b, Ethernet and fiberoptic interfaces.

In 2006, Media Composer 2.5 was the first version to be offered 'software-only', giving the user the option of purchasing and using the software without the additional cost of the external accelerators. Software-only Avid setups could use third-party breakout boxes, usually interfaced via FireWire, to acquire video from SDI and analog sources.

In 2008, the Mojo DX and Nitris DX were introduced, replacing the Adrenaline. Both are capable of handling uncompressed HD video, with the Nitris DX offering greater processing speed and input/output flexibility.

Avid designed hardware 
Avid systems used to ship with Avid branded I/O boxes, like Mojo, Adrenaline and Nitris, but in recent years have ceased to produce their own hardware, and have started collaborating with companies like Blackmagic Design and AJA, releasing customised, Avid-branded I/O boxes, like DNxIO, DNxIQ and DNxIV.

Third-party supported hardware 
Starting with Media Composer 6, a new Open IO API allowed third-party companies to interface their hardware into Media Composer.  AJA Video Systems, Blackmagic Design, Matrox, BlueFish and MOTU are supporting this API. Avid's own DX hardware is still natively interfaced into the application which currently allows some extra features that Open IO is limited in (LTC timecode support for example).  It is expected that over time some of these missing APIs will be added.

AJA IO Express:  Starting with Media Composer 5.5, introduced support for the AJA IO Express interface.  This interface will allow SD/HD input and output via SDI and HDMI.  It also has analog video and audio outputs for monitoring.  It connects to a computer via PCIe or ExpressCard/34 interface.

Matrox MXO2 Mini:  Starting with Media Composer 5, Avid introduced support for the Matrox MXO2 Mini interface, as a breakout box with no additional processing.  While this interface does have input connections, only output is supported by Media Composer v5.x, starting with Media Composer v6.x you can capture with this interface.  The connections on the unit support analog video/audio and HDMI in both SD and HD formats.  The device is connected by a cable to either a PCIe card or ExpressCard/34 interface, so this unit can be used on a desktop or laptop system.

Avid Media Composer compatible hardware is manufactured by AJA Video Systems, Blackmagic Design, BlueFish, Matrox and MOTU.

Discontinued hardware 
Avid Mojo: includes Composite and S-Video with two channels of RCA audio. There is an optional component video cable that can be added to this interface.  This interface only supports SD video formats.

Avid Mojo SDI: includes Composite, S-Video, Component and SDI video, with 4 channels RCA, 4 channels AES and 2 channels optical S/PDIF audio.  This interface only supports SD video formats.

Avid Adrenaline: rack mountable interface which includes Composite, S-Video, Component and SDI video, 4 channels of XLR, 4 channels of AES, 2 channels of S/PDIF and 8 channels of ADAT audio. This interface also has an expansion slot for the DNxcel card which adds HD-SDI input and output as well as a DVI and HD component outputs. The DNxcel card uses Avid's DNxHD compression which is available in 8-bit color formats up to 220mb as well as a 10-bit color format at 220mb. The DNxcel card also adds real-time SD down-convert and HD cross-convert.

Avid Mojo DX : rack mountable interface with various I/O

Avid Nitris DX: : rack mountable interface with various I/O

Features

Key features 
 Managed Media (dedicated media locations and media types which reduce stream counts and increases performance)
 Animatte
 3D Warp
 Paint
 Live Matte Key
 Tracker / Stabiliser
 Timewarps with motion estimation (FluidMotion)
 SpectraMatte (high quality chroma keyer)
 Color Correction toolset (with Natural Match)
 Stereoscopic editing abilities (expanded in MC v6)
 AMA - Avid Media Access, the ability to link to and edit with P2, XDCAM, R3D, QuickTime, AVCHD, and other raw media directly without capture or consolidating/transcoding.
 Mix and Match - put clips of any frame rate, compression, scan mode or video format on the same timeline
 SmartTools - drag and drop style editing on timeline, can be selectively adjusted to the types of actions that the user wants to use when clicking on timeline.
 RTAS - (RealTime AudioSuite), support for realtime track-based audio plug-ins on the timeline.
 5.1 and 7.1 Surround Sound audio mixing, compatible with Pro Tools
 PhraseFind - analyses clips and indexes all dialog phonetically allowing text search of spoken words. (reacquired as of 8.9.3)
 ScriptSync (with Nexidia phonetic indexing and sync) (reacquired as of 8.9.3)

Color correction 
Avid Symphony includes Advanced/Secondary/Relational Color Correction and Universal HD Mastering. Starting with version 7, Symphony became paid option for Media Composer; with version 8, it was included with monthly and annual subscription licenses.

Software protection 
The software used to be protected by means of "blesser" floppy, tied to the Nubus's TrueVista board (meaning that if the board is replaced, a new "blesser" floppy comes with the board), and later with USB dongles. As of version 3.5 the dongle is optional, and existing users may choose to use software activation or keep using their dongles, while new licenses are sold exclusively with software activation. The software ships with installers for both Mac and Windows and can physically be installed on several computers, allowing the user to move the software license between systems or platforms depending on the licensing method.

Licensing options 
With Media Composer 8, Avid introduced monthly and annual subscription licensing systems similar to Adobe Creative Cloud, allowing users to install and activate Avid without purchasing a perpetual license. Media Composer licenses must be confirmed either by Avid's internet servers every 30 days or by an on-site floating license server. Starting with version 8, updates and support for perpetual licenses also require annual support agreements; support is included with subscription licenses.

Installers 
The installer used to include installers for:
 EDL Manager
 Avid Log Exchange (no longer in v8)
 FilmScribe
 MediaLog (no longer in v8)
 Interplay Transfer
 MetaSync Manager (no longer in v6)
 MetaSync Publisher (no longer in v6)
 MetaFuze (Windows only), a standalone application to convert files (R3D, DPX, TIFF) from film scanning, CGI systems or RED camera into MXF media files. Actually based on an import module that was taken from Avid DS.

Third-party software 
Some boxed versions of Media Composer came with the following third party software:

Avid FX - 2D & 3D compositing and titling software (aka Boris RED)
Sorenson Squeeze - Compression software to create, Windows Media, QuickTime, MPEG 1/2, MPEG 4 or Flash video (v8 monthly/annual subscription only)
SonicFire Pro 5 - music creation software (includes 2 CDs of music tracks)
Avid DVD by Sonic - DVD and Blu-ray authoring software (Windows only; no longer updated as of v8)
NewBlue Titler Pro - 2D and 3D video title software (v8 perpetual licenses bundled with v1, subscription licenses with v2)
Boris Continuum Complete - 2D and 3D graphics and effects (v8 monthly/annual subscription only)

Revisions and features

References

External links

Video editing software
Film and video technology
Video editing software for macOS
Video editing software for Windows